Ki Kore Toke Bolbo is a 2016 Indian Bengali language romantic drama film directed by Rabi Kinnagi and produced by Shrikant Mohta. The first look poster of the film was released on 15 January 2016. This title was inspired from song Ki Kore Toke Bolbo from the film Rangbaaz, sung by Arijit Singh. The film stars Ankush Hazra and Mimi Chakraborty. The actors Mimi and Ankush pair for the first time in this movie.

Though the movie was a remake of 2007 Kannada movie Milana, the premise and the core story line had similarities with the 2015 Bengali movie Shudhu Tomari Jonyo. This was because Shudhu Tomari Jonyo was a remake of the 2013 Tamil movie Raja Rani which was unofficially inspired by the 2007 Kannada movie Milana.

Plot

The movie starts in a police station where a police is beating a boy named Akash for loving a girl named Priya. Akash is released from the jail and the police officer says that Priya herself complains to the police officer. Akash goes to Priya's house to know the truth. Akash learns that Priya's marriage had been fixed with another man and this is why her father complains in the police station. Priya says that she hopes he would get a better wife. Akash is left heartbroken. His parents notice that and request to Akash marry. Akash calmly agrees and marries Anjali, the girl his parents choose for him. But Anjali wants divorce in their first night and Akash agrees. Akash and Anjali go to divorce office and the court gives them six months to set things right between them.

Akash then learns that Anjali loves a man named Vikram. But her father forces her to marry with Akash. One day Akash saves Anjali from local boys, who was teasing her in a harsh manner. Akash and Anjali goes to a mall and Anjali sees Vikram there. Akash then scarifies his married life and try to trace Vikram through a fake lottery contest in his radio channel, to contact Vikram. Later Akash takes Anjali to Vikram and they become reunited. One day Vikram tells Anjali to attend the valentine's day party. Anjali finds Vikram drunk and Vikram says that he took 50 lakh rupees from her father for Anjali's marriage with Akash. Anjali left heartbroken. Later Akash saves Anjali from humiliation in that party. After returning home Anjali tried to commit suicide but Akash saves her in time. Also he encouraged her to pursue a dream of completing her MS degree from US and declare her as his Best Friend.

After all incidents, gradually Anjali starts to fall in love with Akash. But she did not able to gather courage to express her love to  Akash. When Akash's parents come to meet them, they have to act in front of their parents to make them happy. Then also Anjali starts to love Akash's parents as she lost her mother since childhood and also had bitter relationship with her father. One day, his mother gets the divorce paper. Akash then tells the whole matter to his mother. After Akash's parents left, he thanked Anjali to act perfectly, but Anjali tried to say Akash that she did not act and all her activities with his parents was real as she started to love Akash and his family. Later Akash also called Anjali's father to their house and after understanding her faults, she confessed to her father and felt guilty of all wrong doings she had done with Akash. 
  
When the six months given by the court is over they go to the court and they signed to the divorce paper. Anjali left heartbroken and she goes to airport with her father, asking Akash not to go with her to Airport. Divorce judge tells Akash that him and Anjali do not seem as other divorced couples, who don't even ready to see other again. After returning home Akash felt lonely and understands that he also loved Anjali. He rushed to the airport where Vikram and his henchmen come to beat Akash, but Akash fights with them. Then local Don (Shantilal Mukherjee) comes to his rescue and hence paid back his dues, as once Akash helped his sister's marriage. Akash goes to airport and find Anjali there. Anjali tells him that she can't leave him and Akash also express his love. They become reunited. Akash gave a good news to Anjali, that he actually got a better wife than Priya. On the other hand he has to eat Bread-Jam made by Anjali for whole life.

Cast

 Ankush Hazra as Akash
 Mimi Chakraborty as Anjali
 Shankar Chakraborty as Akash's father
 Bharat Kaul as Anjali's father
 Shantilal Mukherjee as a local don
 Kharaj Mukherjee as Akash's neighbour
 Biswajit Chakraborty
 Biswanath Basu as Biswanath Das, Divorce specialist
 Pathikrit Basu
 Supriyo Dutta as Police inspector
 Pradip Dhar 
 Rajat Ganguly
 Reshmi Sen as Akash's mother
 Soghoshree Sinha
 Manasi Sinha
 Mousumi Saha
 Alivia Sarkar as Rupa
 Paran Bandopadhyay as Mr. Roy, in a guest appearance
 Chhetali Dasgupta in a guest appearance 
 Sujoy as Bikram
 Debjani Modak (Kinni) as Priya, in a guest appearance.

Soundtrack

References

External links
 

Bengali-language Indian films
2010s Bengali-language films
2016 films
Bengali remakes of Kannada films
2016 romantic drama films
Indian romantic drama films